Shaun Smith may refer to:

Shaun Smith (Australian footballer) (born 1969), Australian rules footballer
Shaun Smith (defensive lineman) (born 1981), American football player
Shaun Smith (linebacker) (born 1982), American football player 
Shaun Smith (English footballer) (born 1971), English footballer
Shaun Smith (make-up effects artist), American special effects artist

See also
Shawn Smith (disambiguation)
Sean Smith (disambiguation)